The following is a list of pathologies organized by year of discovery.

See also 

 Lists of diseases
 List of drugs
 List of drugs by year of discovery
 History of medicine
 History of emerging infectious diseases

References

History of medicine
Lists of diseases